USF Magazine may refer to the alumni magazines of the:

 University of San Francisco
 University of South Florida